Turbo51 is a compiler for the programming language Pascal, for the Intel MCS-51 (8051) family of microcontrollers. It features Borland Turbo Pascal 7 syntax, support for inline assembly code, source-level debugging, and optimizations, among others. The compiler is written in Object Pascal and produced with Delphi.

In the 1980s, Intel introduced the 8051 as the first member of the MCS-51 processor family. Today, hundreds of cheap derivatives are available from tens of manufacturers. This makes the architecture very interesting for professionals and hobbyists. It is surprising that this 8-bit architecture is still in use today, and is still so popular. Of all 8051 compilers, several widely used C compilers exist, but only a few Pascal compilers. Turbo51 is available as freeware and was created with the goal to make a Pascal compiler for MCS-51 processors that will be as fast as Turbo Pascal, will use the same syntax and will generate high quality optimized code.

Language dialect

Turbo51 uses Borland Turbo Pascal 7 dialect. The syntax was extended with some constructs to support specific features of MCS-51 processors.

Var   RS485_TX: Boolean absolute P3.2;
      I2C.SDA:   Boolean absolute P3.7;
      I2C.SCL:   Boolean absolute P3.4;

      EEPROM_Data:    TEEPROM_Data XDATA absolute 0;

      ModuleAddress:  Byte;
      RX_LedTimer:    Byte;
      TX_LedTimer:    Byte;

      SavedOutput:    TOutputData IDATA;
      OutputsAuxData: Array [1..8] of Byte IDATA;

Features

 Win32 console application
 Fast single pass optimizing compiler
 Borland Turbo Pascal 7 syntax
 Full floating point support
 Mixed Pascal and assembly programming
 Full use of register banks
 Advanced multi-pass optimizer
 Smart linker
 Generates compact high quality code
 Output formats: Binary, Intel HEX, OMF51 Object Module Format
 Assembly source code generation

"Hello World" example

Program HelloWorld;

Const
 Osc      = 22118400;
 BaudRate = 19200;

 BaudRateTimerValue = Byte (- Osc div 12 div 32 div BaudRate);

Var SerialPort: Text;

Procedure WriteToSerialPort; Assembler;
Asm
  CLR   TI
  MOV   SBUF, A
@WaitLoop:
  JNB   TI, @WaitLoop
end;

Procedure Init;
begin
  TL1  := BaudRateTimerValue;
  TH1  := BaudRateTimerValue;
  TMOD := %00100001;    { Timer1: no GATE, 8 bit timer, autoreload }
  SCON := %01010000;    { Serial Mode 1, Enable Reception }
  TI   := True;         { Indicate TX ready }
  TR1  := True;         { Enable timer 1 }

  Assign (SerialPort, WriteToSerialPort)
end;

begin
  Init;
  Writeln (SerialPort, 'Hello world!')
end.

See also 
 Intel 8051
 Pascal (programming language)
 Comparison of Pascal and C
 Borland
 Turbo Pascal

External links 

 

Pascal (programming language) compilers
Pascal programming language family
Object-oriented programming languages
compilers and interpreters
Pascal (programming language) software